I Want can refer to:
I Want (One Direction song), from their debut album "Up All Night"
I Want (Department S song), their third single
I Want, a 2016 song by MadeinTYO from the mixtape "You Are Forgiven"
I Want, a 2017 song by Ruby Fields from Fields' EP Your Dad's Opinion for Dinner.
"I Want" song, a type of song popular in musical theatre